Leszczany may refer to the following places:
Leszczany, Lublin Voivodeship (east Poland)
Leszczany, Gmina Krynki in Podlaskie Voivodeship (north-east Poland)
Leszczany, Gmina Suchowola in Podlaskie Voivodeship (north-east Poland)